Aruba competed at the 2016 Summer Olympics in Rio de Janeiro, Brazil, from 5 to 21 August 2016. This was the nation's eighth consecutive appearance at the Summer Olympics.

Aruban Olympic Committee sent the nation's largest team to the Games since the 1988 Summer Olympics in Seoul. A total of seven athletes, three men and four women, were selected to compete in four different sports (judo, sailing, swimming, and taekwondo). Five of them made their Olympic debut at these Games, with Laser Radial sailor Philipine van Aanholt, who previously represented as a member of the Independent Olympic Athletes, and judoka Jayme Mata returning for their second appearance from London 2012. 2010 Youth Olympian Nicole van der Velden served as the nation's flag bearer in the opening ceremony.

Aruba, however, has never won a single Olympic medal.

Judo

Aruba has qualified one judoka for the men's half-lightweight category (66 kg) at the Games. London 2012 Olympian Jayme Mata earned a continental quota spot from the Pan American region, as the highest-ranked Aruban judoka outside of direct qualifying position in the IJF World Ranking List of 30 May 2016.

Sailing
 
Aruban sailors have qualified one boat in each of the following classes through the individual fleet World Championships and the 2015 Pan American Games, signifying the nation's return to the sport after a 24-year hiatus.

M = Medal race; EL = Eliminated – did not advance into the medal race

Swimming

Aruba has received a Universality invitation from FINA to send two swimmers (one male and one female) to the Olympics.

Taekwondo
 
Aruba entered one athlete into the taekwondo competition for the first time at the Olympics. Monica Pimentel secured a spot in the women's flyweight category (49 kg) by virtue of her top two finish at the 2016 Pan American Qualification Tournament in Aguascalientes, Mexico.

See also
Aruba at the 2015 Pan American Games

References

External links 

 

Nations at the 2016 Summer Olympics
2016
Olympics